Arhopala paramuta, the hooked oakblue, is a butterfly of the family Lycaenidae. It is found in South-East Asia (see subspecies section).

Subspecies
 Arhopala paramuta paramuta (Assam, Sikkim, Burma, northern Thailand, southern China)
 Arhopala paramuta horishana (Taiwan)

References

Arhopala
Butterflies of Asia
Butterflies of Indochina
Taxa named by Lionel de Nicéville